The Australian Consulate-General in Surabaya represents the Commonwealth of Australia in Surabaya, the second most populous city in Indonesia. The Consulate-General of Australia in Surabaya was established in February 2017, and is the fourth diplomatic mission of Australia in Indonesia after Jakarta (1935), Denpasar (1981), and Makassar (2016). The seat of consulate-general located at Level 3 ESA Sampoerna Center, Sukolilo, Surabaya, East Java. Chris Barnes is the first consul-general in Surabaya. He has been replaced with Fiona Hoggart since December of 2021.

See also
 Australia–Indonesia relations
 Embassy of Australia, Jakarta
 List of Consuls-General of Australia in Bali
 Australian ambassadors to Indonesia
 Embassy of Indonesia, Canberra
 Indonesian ambassadors to Australia
 Diplomatic missions of Australia
 Diplomatic missions in Indonesia

References

External links
 Official website of Consulate-General of Australia in Surabaya

Consulate-General
Surabaya
Australia